Leila Pärtelpoeg ( Brakel, until 1951 Pelmas; born on 17 September 1927 Tallinn) is an Estonian interior architect and pedagog.

After graduating in 1954 from the Estonian Art Institute (ERKI), she started working the same year up until 1961 at the institution Soviet Union Commerce Chamber's Estonian branch. From 1961 to 1978 she worked at the architecture bureau KIPR. Since 1961 she taught at Estonian Art Institute.

Awards:
 1984: Estonian SSR merited architect
 2001: Order of the White Star, IV class.

Publications

 Mööbel. Tallinn, 1995
 Härra Vene maailm ... – Viljandi Muuseumi aastaraamat. Viljandi, 2000
 Pööningul. Tallinn, 2005
 Tööraamat /A Life's Work. Compiled by K. Roosi. Tartu, 2011

References

Living people
1927 births
Estonian women architects
Recipients of the Order of the White Star, 4th Class
Architects from Tallinn
Estonian Academy of Arts alumni